Ypthima doleta, the common ringlet, is a butterfly in the family Nymphalidae. It is found in Senegal, Guinea-Bissau, Guinea, Sierra Leone, Liberia, Ivory Coast, Ghana, Togo, Benin, Nigeria, Cameroon, Gabon, the Republic of the Congo, the Central African Republic, Angola, the Democratic Republic of the Congo, southern Sudan, Uganda and north-western Tanzania. The habitat consists of humid areas, including farmland, forest margins and glades.

References

doleta
Butterflies described in 1880
Butterflies of Africa
Taxa named by William Forsell Kirby